Christopher Chinedu Okoh (born 5 June 1976) is a former professional footballer who played as a defender. Born in Nigeria, he represented the Malta national team.

Playing career
He played for Valletta, Floriana, Kercem Ajax, Naxxar Lions, Birkirkara and Sliema Wanderers.

International career
He also represented the Malta national team.

External links
 Chris Okoh at PlayerHistory.com 
 Nigerian football players in Europe
 

1976 births
Living people
People with acquired Maltese citizenship
Maltese footballers
Malta international footballers
Valletta F.C. players
Floriana F.C. players
Naxxar Lions F.C. players
Pietà Hotspurs F.C. players
Birkirkara F.C. players
Sliema Wanderers F.C. players
Nigerian emigrants to Malta
Nigerian expatriates in Austria
Association football defenders